Edward Ambrose Dyson (15 December 1908 – 26 November 1952), often known as "Amby" or "Amb Dyson" was an Australian illustrator, comics artist  and political cartoonist.

Biography
He was born in Melbourne on 15 December 1908, the son of Ambrose Dyson (1876–1913) and Mabel Fraser.

Dyson was a student at Yarra Park State School until 1922, when he started working as a labourer, which lasted 14 years, when he took some lessons and embarked on a full-time artistic career.

In 1944 he was working as a cartoonist for the army newspaper SALT (for Sea, Air, Land Transport). It was there he became a friend and associate of Frank Hardy, sharing Hardy's left-wing views and joining the Communist Party of Australia. He contributed drawings to Hardy's masterpiece Power Without Glory.

Dyson died on 26 November 1952.

Bibliography
Hardy, Frank (as "Ross Franklyn") Power without Glory (14 drawings by Ambrose Dyson) 1950
Lambert, Eric Gold (13 drawings by Ambrose Dyson) Melbourne 1951
Hardy, Frank J. The Man from Clinkapella with a foreword by Alan Marshall, ill. Ambrose Dyson 1952
Ambrose Dyson with foreword by Frank Hardy and a memorial poem by David Martin. Ambrose Dyson Memorial Committee, 1953

Sources
McCullough, Alan Encyclopedia of Australian Art Hutchinson of London 1968
A Dyson Bibliography
Lambiek Comiclopedia article.

References

1908 births
1952 deaths
Australian cartoonists
Australian comics artists
Australian people of English descent
Australian satirists
Cartoonists from Melbourne